Production rule may refer to:
Production rules used in business rule engines, cognitive modeling and artificial intelligence, see Production system
Production rules that expand nodes in formal grammars, see production (computer science)
Rules governing legal requests that documents be provided, see request for production

See also
 Production Rule Representation, an OMG standard for production rules used in production systems